Stachys recta, commonly known as stiff hedgenettle or perennial yellow-woundwort, is herbaceous perennial plant of the family Lamiaceae.

Etymology
The generic epithet is derived from the Greek word σταχυς (stachys), meaning "an ear of grain", and refers to the fact that the inflorescence is often a spike. The specific epithet comes from the Latin recta, meaning   "straight", also refers to the shape of the inflorescence.

Description
 The biological form of S. recta is hemicryptophyte scapose, as its overwintering buds are situated just below the soil surface and the floral axis is more or less erect with a few leaves.

The plant reaches on average  in height. It has thick, woody roots. The stems are strong, simple or branched, with slightly rough glandular hairs. The leaves are ovate-spatulate to oblong-lanceolate, with toothed edges and a long petiole.

The flowers are gathered in a dense terminal spike and are usually yellowish-white, stained by purple or brown spots. The flowering period extends from July through October. The flowers are hermaphrodite and pollinated by insects. The fruit are achenesabout 2 mm long, rounded, chestnut-brown and smooth or very finely punctured. This plant is strictly related to S. officinalis, and has similar properties and characteristics.

Distribution
This plant is a sub-Mediterranean floral element and it is widespread from Europe to the Caucasus and Asia Minor.

Habitat
Stachys recta grows in lawns, in semi-dry and dry grasslands and in rocky hillsides.

Gallery

Subspecies
 Stachys recta L. subsp. labiosa (Bertol.) Briq.
 Stachys recta L. subsp. recta.
 Stachys recta L. subsp. subcrenata (Vis.) Briq. 
 Stachys recta L. subsp. tenoreana Bornm.

References

External links

  Biolib
 Stachys recta
 Stachys recta

recta
Flora of Asia
Flora of Europe
Taxa named by Carl Linnaeus